= Zingotos Kome =

Town of ancient Phrygia

Coordinates: 39°13′08″N 30°05′52″E

Zingotos Kome was a town of ancient Phrygia, inhabited in Roman and Byzantine times.

Its site is located near Doğalar in Asiatic Turkey.
